Youhanabad is an area in Lahore, Pakistan. It is the largest majority Christian area in the city. A 2006 report put the number of inhabitants at 200,000, while it was reported by DAWN in 2015 that the area was home to at least 100,000 Christians.

Two churches were attacked on 15 March 2015, a Sunday, by suicide bombers. At least 15 people, including two policemen, were killed and 78 injured, 30 of them critically. The militant Islamist group Jamaat-ul-Ahrar said they were behind the attacks. An enraged Christian mob killed two Muslims, in an instance of Street Vigilantism, and later it was revealed that the two Muslims were innocent though eyewitnesses claim the individuals were involved in the attack. Later, many Christians were arrested.

References

Christianity in Lahore
Geography of Lahore